Smolugi  is a village in the administrative district of Gmina Dziadkowice, within Siemiatycze County, Podlaskie Voivodeship, in north-eastern Poland.

According to the 1921 census, the village was inhabited by 113 people, among whom 101 were Roman Catholic, 7 Orthodox, and 5 Mosaic. At the same time, 106 inhabitants declared Polish nationality, 7 Belarusian. There were 18 residential buildings in the village.

The village has a population of 124.

References

Smolugi